James L. Archibald (born June 6, 1961) is a Canadian former ice hockey player.  He played right wing and played 16 games in the National Hockey League for the Minnesota North Stars between 1985 and 1987. He lives in Brainerd, Minnesota.

After playing in junior level with the Moose Jaw Canucks, Archibald was drafted in the seventh round, 139th overall by the Minnesota North Stars in the 1981 NHL Entry Draft. He attended school at the University of North Dakota the same year until 1985. In his NHL career he played in 16 regular season games scoring one goal and two assists. He also had spells in the American Hockey League for the Springfield Indians and the International Hockey League with the Kalamazoo Wings.

While head coach at Brainerd, his son, Josh Archibald, played there. After his senior season, Josh was drafted by the Pittsburgh Penguins in the sixth round of the 2011 NHL Entry Draft. Josh was a finalist for the Minnesota Mr. Hockey Award in 2011.

Career statistics

Regular season and playoffs

Awards and honours

References

External links

1961 births
Living people
Canadian expatriate ice hockey players in the United States
Canadian ice hockey right wingers
Ice hockey people from Saskatchewan
Kalamazoo Wings (1974–2000) players
Minnesota North Stars draft picks
Minnesota North Stars players
Moose Jaw Canucks players
NCAA men's ice hockey national champions
North Dakota Fighting Hawks men's ice hockey players
People from Craik, Saskatchewan
Springfield Indians players